A Little Night Music is a 1973 musical by Stephen Sondheim and Hugh Wheeler.

A Little Night Music may also refer to:
 "A Little Night Music" (Designing Women), an episode of Designing Women
 "A Little Night Music" (Desperate Housewives), an episode of Desperate Housewives
 "A Little Night Music'" (The Americans), an episode of The Americans
 A Little Night Music (film), the 1977 film adaptation of the 1973 musical
 A Little Night Music, literal translation of Eine kleine Nachtmusik ("A little serenade"), a 1787 composition by Mozart

See also
 Eine Kleine Nachtmusik (album), a 1986 album by Venom